George Harrison Dunbar (April 12, 1878 – February 28, 1966) was an Ontario political figure. He represented Ottawa South in the Legislative Assembly of Ontario as a Conservative and then Progressive Conservative member from 1937 to 1959.

Background
He was born in Richmond, Ontario in 1878, the son of Thomas Dunbar, and was educated in Kemptville. In 1892, he married a Miss Coxford. He served as a captain during World War I.

He died in a Toronto hospital on February 28, 1966. The George Dunbar Bridge which crosses the Rideau River near Carleton University in Ottawa was named in his honour.

Politics
Dunbar was controller for the city of Ottawa. He ran for mayor of Ottawa in 1938, but placed third. He served in the provincial cabinet as Minister of Municipal Affairs from 1943 to 1955 and Minister of Reform Institutions from 1946 to 1948; Dunbar was Provincial Secretary and Registrar of Ontario from 1943 to 1946 and from 1955 to 1958.

Cabinet positions

References 

 Canadian Parliamentary Guide, 1947, PG Normandin

External links 
 

1878 births
1966 deaths
Progressive Conservative Party of Ontario MPPs
Provincial Secretaries of Ontario
Ottawa controllers